Song cycles are groups of individually complete songs designed to be performed in sequences as units.

Song cycles may also refer to:
 Song cycles (Killmayer)
 Song cycles (Schubert)
 Song cycles (Waterhouse)